The 2022–23 UMass Lowell River Hawks men's basketball team represented the University of Massachusetts Lowell in the 2022–23 NCAA Division I men's basketball season. They played their home games at the Costello Athletic Center in Lowell, Massachusetts and were led by tenth-year head coach Pat Duquette.

Previous season
They finished the season 15–16, 7–11 in America East Play to finish in 7th place. They lost in the quarterfinals of the America East tournament to UMBC.

Roster

Schedule and results

|-
!colspan=12 style=| Regular season

|-
!colspan=12 style=| America East tournament

References

UMass Lowell River Hawks men's basketball seasons
UMass Lowell River Hawks
2022 in sports in Massachusetts
2023 in sports in Massachusetts